Solveig Guðmundsdóttir (c. 1430 – 1501), was an Icelandic heiress and landlord. 

She was the daughter and heir of judge Guðmundur Arason ríki and landlord Vatnsfjarðar-Kristín Björnsdóttir, the richest couple on Iceland. She is remembered in Icelandic history for her long feud with her uncle over her rich inheritance, which lasted during most of her life.

Notes

Sources 
 „„Miðaldakonur“. 19. júní, 5.-7. tölublað 1929.“,

15th-century Icelandic women
Landlords
15th-century landowners
16th-century landowners
15th-century women landowners